Maria Soave Alemanno (born 15 April 1972) is an Italian politician from the Five Star Movement.

Early life 
She was born in Nardò, Apulia. For many years she worked as an insurance broker.

Political career 
She was elected to the Chamber of Deputies in the 2018 general election.

References 

1972 births
Living people
Women stockbrokers
Italian financial businesspeople
Five Star Movement politicians
People from Nardò
People from Apulia
21st-century Italian politicians
21st-century Italian women politicians
Deputies of Legislature XVIII of Italy
Women members of the Chamber of Deputies (Italy)